Qian Liren (born August 1924) is a Chinese politician, diplomat, and translator. Qian had a distinguished career in foreign affairs, and was China's first ambassador to UNESCO, in addition to being the head of the International Liaison Department of the Communist Party of China between 1983 and 1985. He then served as the head of the People's Daily newspaper, but was removed from the position after the Tiananmen Square protests of 1989.

Early life
Born in 1924 in Jiaxing, Zhejiang province, Qian is a documented descendant of the kings of Wuyue. After moving with his family to Zhenjiang and later to Shanghai during the Second Sino-Japanese War, Qian attended Saint John's University, Shanghai, where he studied chemistry.

Early career
While in secondary school and university, Qian became involved with the anti-Kuomintang student movement and became its leader in Shanghai, becoming president of the Shanghai Secondary Students Association and Secretary of the Shanghai Students Union. He joined the Communist Party of China (CPC) in 1940, and became a member of the CPC Shanghai Committee.

After the establishment of the People's Republic of China in 1949, Qian worked in the international affairs department of the Communist Youth League of China. He was its representative to the World Federation of Democratic Youth in Budapest, Hungary, and became Secretary in the Federation secretariat. His Youth League origins have led to Qian being classified as part of the "Youth League faction" of Hu Yaobang. From the Youth League, he was promoted to head the external affairs office of the State Council (1964–1965).

Purged during the Cultural Revolution, Qian was re-appointed in 1974 as a member of the Standing Council of the Chinese People's Association for Friendship with Foreign Countries, and in 1978 was posted as China's first ambassador to UNESCO. Returning to China from Paris, he became the head of the CPC Central Committee's International Liaison Department. This position would conventionally lead to the post of Foreign Minister. For Qian, however, his next posting as the head of the People's Daily (1985–1989) spelled the end of his rise within the Communist Party.

Qian was a member of the 12th and 13th Central Committees of the Communist Party of China (1985–1992).

Tiananmen Square protests and dismissal
During the Tiananmen Square protests of 1989, Qian was the head of the People's Daily, the Communist Party's official newspaper. At the time, the Communist Party leadership was split between those advocating a conciliatory approach with the students and those advocating a hard-line crackdown. During the protests, the newspaper printed several stories which were later regarded by the government as sympathetic of the students. In addition, both Qian and the Editor-in-Chief Tan Wenrui were accused of tolerating pro-student editors, who obliquely attacked the hardliners in their reporting. Specifically, Qian directly authorised a series of reports, titled "Xth day of Martial Law", which was said to mock the hardliners by exaggerating the frivolity in Beijing while under martial law. Its reportage of international news was also said to satirise the hardliners in the party leadership.

In its June 4 Edition, the People's Daily made a series of editorial decisions which the government later condemned as oblique criticism of the crackdown. In the international news section, for example, the Gwangju Democratization Movement was reported with a headline, printed in bold type, of "Seoul students go on hunger strike to protest government massacre and crackdown". The headline of a story on Poland was "Warning: no-body should play with fire", with a tagline "Polish leaders say elections are a great experiment in reconciliation". A number of reports on "Convicted criminal becomes People's Representative", and "Judge perverts justice" were also included. The headline "the unconquerable man" was printed in the sports section.

More serious, however, was the "People's Daily Extra incident". Some People's Daily employees under the leadership of editor Wu Xuecan organised the printing of an unauthorised "extra" edition, which re-printed student flyers and took the point of view of the student protestors. Only about 1000 copies were reportedly printed, all of which were distributed to the protesting students. The "extra" was a direct response to the "April 26 Editorial", an article written by hawkish party leaders and published in the People's Daily, and which took a hostile attitude to the students. Despite immediately printing a notice that disclaimed the Extra as unauthorised, both Qian and Tan Wenrui were removed from their posts in the purge at the People's Daily that followed the protests.

Later career
Subsequently, Qian did not hold another major government or party position. He was the Vice President of the quasi-official Chinese Association for International Understanding from 1995 to 2003, and acted as advisor to the organisation thereafter.

He was a member of the Standing Committee of the Chinese People's Political Consultative Conference (1993–1998) and occasionally acted as its spokesperson. From 1995 to 1998 he was the head of its Foreign Affairs committee.

Works
Qian is fluent in Chinese, English, French and several other European languages. He has rendered into Chinese the August Coup, Mikhail Gorbachev's memoir of that event.

Personal life
Qian married wife Zheng Yun (born Tang Suiqian) in 1952. They have one son and one daughter.

References

1924 births
Living people
Chinese Communist Party politicians from Zhejiang
Diplomats of the People's Republic of China
Politicians from Jiaxing
People's Republic of China politicians from Zhejiang
St. John's University, Shanghai alumni
Writers from Jiaxing
People's Daily people